The 1953–54 Football League season was Birmingham City Football Club's 51st in the Football League and their 23rd in the Second Division. They finished in seventh position in the 22-team division. They entered the 1953–54 FA Cup at the third round proper and lost to Ipswich Town in the fourth.

Twenty-eight players made at least one appearance in nationally organised first-team competition, and there were eleven different goalscorers. Full-back Ken Green played in 41 of the 44 first-team matches over the season, and Ted Purdon was leading goalscorer with 15 goals, all scored in league competition.

Football League Second Division

Note that not all teams completed their playing season on the same day. Birmingham were in sixth position after their last game of the season, on 24 April, but by the time the last game was played, five days later, they were seventh, having been overtaken by Rotherham United.

League table (part)

FA Cup

Appearances and goals

Players with name struck through and marked  left the club during the playing season.

See also
Birmingham City F.C. seasons

References
General
 
 
 Source for match dates and results: 
 Source for lineups, appearances, goalscorers and attendances: Matthews (2010), Complete Record, pp. 342–43.
 Source for kit: "Birmingham City". Historical Football Kits. Retrieved 22 May 2018.

Specific

Birmingham City F.C. seasons
Birmingham City